Gothica is the thirteenth studio album by the melodic hard rock band Ten. The album was released on 7 July 2017. The album was mixed and mastered by Dennis Ward, while the cover was illustrated by Stan W. Decker. The first single from the album, the track "Paragon", was released on 26 May, while the second one "La Luna Dra-Cu-La", was released on 23 June. The first official music video for "Gothica", was for the track "Travellers", on the 3rd of July 2017, while "Jekyll And Hyde", the second official music video from the album, was released on the 1st of August, 2017. The album proved to be another successful release for the band, reaching the 11th position on BBC's Rock Albums Charts.

Track listing
All songs written by Gary Hughes.
 The Grail – 8:06
 Jekyll and Hyde – 4:41
 Travellers – 5:11
 A Man for All Seasons – 7:00
 In My Dreams – 5:08
 The Wild King of Winter – 6:13
 Paragon – 4:50
 Welcome to the Freak Show – 5:35
 La Luna Dra-Cu-La – 5:31
 Into Darkness – 5:42
 Paragon (Bonus Mix) (Japanese Bonus Track) - 3:37

Personnel

Ten
Gary Hughes – vocals, guitars, backing vocals
Dann Rosingana – lead guitars
Steve Grocott – lead guitars
John Halliwell – rhythm guitars
Darrel Treece-Birch – keyboards, programming
Steve Mckenna – bass guitar
Max Yates – drums and percussion

Production
Gary Hughes – production
Dennis Ward – mixing and mastering

Concepts
 The lyrics of the track "Jekyll and Hyde" are based on Robert Louis Stevenson's Strange Case of Dr Jekyll and Mr Hyde (1886).
 According to Gary Hughes, the lyrics of the track "Travellers" are inspired by H. G. Wells' The Time Machine (1895).
 The lyrics of the track "A Man for All Seasons" are based on Robert Bolt's A Man for All Seasons (1966).
 The lyrics of the track "Wild King of Winter" are based on George R. R. Martin's A Song of Ice and Fire series.

Chart positions

References

Ten (band) albums
2017 albums